The 1988 Ugandan Super League was the 21st season of the official Ugandan football championship, the top-level football league of Uganda.

Overview
The 1988 Uganda Super League was won by SC Villa, while Tobacco, State House FC and UCI were relegated.

League standings
The final league table is not available for 1988. Teams that competed in the  Super League included:
SC Villa - Champions
Express FC
Kampala City Council FC
Nsambya Old Timers
Coffee Kakira
Uganda Airlines
Nile Breweries FC
Tobacco - Relegated
State House FC - Relegated
UCI - Relegated

Leading goalscorer
The top goalscorer in the 1988 season was Mathias Kaweesa of Nsambya FC with 17 goals.

References

External links
Uganda - List of Champions - RSSSF (Hans Schöggl)
Ugandan Football League Tables - League321.com

Ugandan Super League seasons
Uganda
Uganda
1